Starnberg is a German town in Bavaria, Germany, some  southwest of Munich. It is at the north end of Lake Starnberg, in the heart of the "Five Lakes Country", and serves as capital of the district of Starnberg. Recording a disposable per-capita income of €26,120 in 2007, Starnberg regained its status as the wealthiest town in Germany.

History
The town was first mentioned in 1226 under the name of Aheim am Würmsee.

Incorporated districts
Districts (Ortsteile) are listed with their year of incorporation and area.  

Hadorf (1978, 6.93 km²) 
Hanfeld with Mamhofen (1972, 5.58 km²) 
Leutstetten with Einbettl , Mühlthal , Oberdill , Petersbrunn and Schwaige (1978, 7.68 km²) 
Percha with Buchhof , Heimathshausen and Selcha (1978, 6 , 07 km²) 
Perchting with Landstetten , Jägersbrunn and Sonnau (1978, 11.36 km²) 
Rieden (1803, 1.83 km²) 
Söcking (1978, 8.17 km²) 
Wangen with Fercha, Schorn, Unterschorn and Wildmoos (1978, 7.49 km²)

Transport
Both are served by the Munich S-Bahn line S6, which provides frequent trains to and from Munich. In addition, Starnberg is a principal stop for the vessels of the Bayerische Seenschifffahrt or lake fleet.

Main sights
 Starnberger Schloss (castle) with the castle garden
 St. Joseph's Church

Notable people
 Lothar-Günther Buchheim (1918–2007), author (Das Boot published in 1973 and source for the epic film and mini-series) and painter died at Starnburg
 Dietrich Fischer-Dieskau (1925–2012), baritone
 Oskar Maria Graf (1894–1967), the socially conscious writer, was born in Aufkirchen near Starnberg in 1894.  He fought for the Bavarian Soviet Republic (or Räterepublik) in Munich in 1919.  He fled his homeland in 1938 with his Jewish wife for the U.S.A., when National Socialism gripped Germany.  Graf was never fully able to adjust to life in the United States or, more to the point, away from his homeland, Bavaria
 Jürgen Habermas (born 1929), philosopher and sociologist whom has long lived and worked in Starnberg as a director of the "Max-Planck-Institut zur Erforschung der Lebensbedingungen der wissenschaftlich-technischen Welt"
 Johannes Heesters (1903–2011), actor; lived in Starnberg until his death
 King Ludwig II of Bavaria (1845–1886), mysteriously drowned in Lake Starnberg at the small town of Berg nearby, on the evening of 13 June 1886
 Herbert Marcuse (1898–1979), Frankfurt School philosopher, died in Starnberg
 Gustav Meyrink (1868–1932), The Austrian writer was a resident of Starnberg from 1911 until his death in 1932 and is buried in the local cemetery. Among his best remembered works is The Golem, which inspired the 1920 classic German Expressionist film The Golem: How He Came into the World
 Christian Reiher (born 1984), Multiple IMO (International Mathematical Olympiad) gold medalist winner that was born in Starnberg
 Marianne Sägebrecht (born 1945), Actress; was born here in Starnberg (Bagdad Café and other films)
 Adrian Sutil (born 1983), Formula One driver; was born in Starnberg
 Maha Vajiralongkorn (born 1952), 10th king of Thailand
 Karl Wolff (1900–1984), SS General; lived in Starnberg after the war

References

External links
 Starnberg information
 Starnberger See – Lake Starnberg
 Starnberg official website
 Five Lakes Country tourist information
 Pictures of Starnberg

Starnberg (district)